Kanuni Bridge or Palace Bridge, is a historic Ottoman bridge in Edirne, Turkey. It crosses the Tunca river, connecting Edirne Palace with the city. It is named after Suleiman the Magnificent, known in Turkish by the epithet "the Lawmaker", who commissioned the construction.

References

 Ottoman Architecture, John Freely, page 87, 2011

External links

Ottoman bridges in Turkey
Arch bridges in Turkey
Bridges completed in 1554
Mimar Sinan buildings
Ottoman architecture in Edirne
Bridges over the Tunca
Road bridges in Turkey
Bridges in Edirne
1554 establishments in the Ottoman Empire